Frederick Stephenson may refer to:

 Frederick Stephenson (British Army officer) (1821–1911)
 Frederick Stephenson (English cricketer) (1853–1927)
 Frederick Stephenson (New Zealand cricketer) (1871–1944)